North Hudson is the name of the following places in the United States of America:
North Hudson, New Jersey
North Hudson, New York
North Hudson, Wisconsin